The Galíndez File is a 2003 drama film directed by Gerardo Herrero and starring Saffron Burrows, Harvey Keitel, Eduard Fernández and Guillermo Toledo.  It is based on Manuel Vázquez Montalbán's 1991 novel Galíndez.

Cast
Saffron Burrows as Muriel Colber
Harvey Keitel as Edward Robards
Eduard Fernández as Galíndez
Guillermo Toledo as Ricardo
Reynaldo Miravalles as Don Angelito
John Furey as Norman Radcliffe
Chete Lera as Diplomático
Enrique Almirante as Trujillo
Txema Blasco as Ricardo's Uncle

References

External links
 
 

Films based on Spanish novels
Films scored by Patrick Doyle
2000s Spanish-language films
Spanish drama films
British drama films
Italian drama films
Portuguese drama films
Cuban drama films
French drama films
Films directed by Gerardo Herrero
Films set in the Dominican Republic
French films set in New York City
Films set in Madrid
Films set in 1988
Films set in 1956
Films about the Central Intelligence Agency
2003 drama films
2003 multilingual films
2000s English-language films
Spanish multilingual films
British multilingual films
Italian multilingual films
Portuguese multilingual films
French multilingual films
British films set in New York City
2000s British films
2000s Spanish films
2000s French films